Quirinus van Amelsfoort (1760–1820) was a Dutch painter.

Life
Van Amelsfoort was born and died at 's-Hertogenbosch. He painted allegories, history, and portraits; in the last the likenesses were remarkable for their truth.

In 1804-5 the departmental government of Brabant commissioned a set of fifteen paintings of coats of arms from van Amelsfoort and Franciscus Johannes de Groot. They are now in the collection of the Noordbrabants Museum.

References

1760 births
1820 deaths
19th-century Dutch painters
People from 's-Hertogenbosch
18th-century Dutch painters
18th-century Dutch male artists
Dutch male painters
19th-century Dutch male artists